Nicolae Mitea (born 24 March 1985) is a Romanian former professional footballer who played as a winger. Between 2003 and 2005, he made eight appearances for the Romania national team scoring two goals.

Club career
In 1998, Mitea and Roberto Iancu were taken by coach Ionuț Chirilă on a one-week trial at FC Barcelona, but despite leaving a good impression, they did not sign a contract because of some problems with their sports agent.

Mitea started his professional career in the Romanian Divizia A, playing for FC Dinamo București in the 2002–03 season. After having played only 9 matches in the Romanian league, he was picked up by Dutch club Ajax after he impressed on a trial.

Before he left he and Dinamo won the Cupa României. His first season at Ajax was a success as he, at the age of 18, played 23 matches and scored 7 goals in the Dutch Eredivisie and in the process winning the league title with Ajax.

This period also saw him making his debut for the Romania national team on 20 August 2003. The 2004–05 season proved more difficult, as Mitea struggled to find the back of the net and only scored twice during that season. He performed very well on the Romanian youth team and became more interesting for the national team.

2005 was his breakthrough year in the national team, as he played 4 matches that year in which he scored twice. He established himself as a more important player for the team as well. His development in his career was set on hold due to a knee injury which sidelined him for a long time, resulting in only one appearance for Ajax in the 2005–06 season. Also in the following season Mitea did not play regularly as manager Henk ten Cate choose to overlook him and he was no longer first choice for the left-wing position. Despite the lack of appearances in these two seasons he did add 2006–07 KNVB Cups to his list of trophies.

Due to minor injuries and still being out of favour with Henk Ten Cate, and then temporary replacement coach Adrie Koster, Mitea did not play a single game for Ajax during the 2007–08 season. He was not in new coach Marco van Basten's plans and was told to look for a new club.

Mitea returned to Dinamo București in August 2008 signing a four-year contract, but after only one season, in the summer of 2009 he left Dinamo and became a free agent.

Career statistics

Honours
Dinamo București
Romanian Cup: 2002–03

Ajax
Eredivisie: 2003–04
KNVB Cup: 2006–07

References

External links
 Voetbal International profile 
 
 
 

Living people
1985 births
Footballers from Bucharest
Romanian footballers
Association football wingers
Romania international footballers
Romania under-21 international footballers
Liga I players
FC Dinamo București players
FC Petrolul Ploiești players
Eredivisie players
AFC Ajax players
CS Concordia Chiajna players
Romanian expatriate footballers
Romanian expatriate sportspeople in the Netherlands
Expatriate footballers in the Netherlands